Due to the American-controlled Panama Canal cutting across the center of the country, Panama was of major strategic importance to the Allied war effort, as well as the most important strategic location in Latin America during World War II. It provided an invaluable link between the Atlantic and Pacific Oceans that was vital to both commerce and the defense of the Western Hemisphere. Therefore, the defense of the Canal Zone was the United States' chief concern in the American Theater. Panama never received Lend-Lease assistance, but in return for the rights to build military infrastructure within Panamanian territory, the United States undertook large-scale public works projects, which did much to modernize the country and boost the economy.

History

Economics
According to Thomas M. Leonard's Latin America during World War II, the war had a major impact on the Panamanian economy. Commercial transit through the canal dropped more than a third between 1940 and 1945, resulting in a two-thirds decrease in toll revenues. In contrast, Panama's domestic production rose, due to an increased demand caused by the war. Production of sugar, milk, and slaughtered cattle nearly doubled between 1939 and 1946. The government accelerated the take off by quadrupling expenditures, but the real catalyst was the influx in American dollars.

Between 1930 and 1943, American capital investments dropped sharply in every Latin American country except oil-rich Venezuela and Panama. Leonard says that Panama enjoyed the higher percentage increase of the two, as investment multiplied threefold to $514 million, mostly in banking and utilities. The number of American-controlled enterprises increased from twenty-two in 1929 to seventy-nine in 1943. Additionally, an estimated 12.5 percent of the Panamanian workforce was employed in the Canal Zone. In 1939, there were 3,511 "gold roll" (U.S. rate) workers in the zone, and 11, 246 "silver roll" (local rate) workers. By 1942 the numbers had grown to 8,550 and 28,686, respectively. The influx of workers to the Canal Zone and to Panama City and Colón was so large that the Panamanian government complained about the scarcity of teachers and other skilled employees. The government did, however, try to take advantage of the situation by "strengthening" English language education in schools and emphasizing vocational training in commercial and business administration so as to encourage the development of small businesses and provide skilled employees for the increased number of commercial enterprises.

Panamanians, as well as immigrants were employed in the construction of a third set of locks for the canal, numerous highways, and over 100 defense sites across the country. The highway construction included a stretch of road from Panama City to Río Hato Field in the west, and a road between Panama City and Colon, known as the Transisthmian Highway. Along with the increased number of Panamanians, the United States also imported thousands of workers from other Central American nations and the West Indies. The additional workers and military personnel prompted the American government to purchase huge amounts of food and other goods, thus helping to spur activity in Panama's agricultural industry.

President Arias
Elected in 1940, Arnulfo Arias was the President of Panama during two of the first years of the war. He was an overt fascist and regarded as pro-Axis by the Allies for his hostility to the United States and his eagerness to limit American influence over his territory. In 1939, the United States military requested 999-year leases from the Republic of Panama to build over 100 sites outside the Canal Zone – such as airfields, anti-aircraft batteries, and warning stations – which would be used for the defense of the canal. Arias demanded compensation in the form of cash and the transfer to Panama of various properties, but for the United States the price was too high. Negotiations dragged on for the next two years. Eventually, on February 13, 1941, the Panamanian government advised the Americans that, if it were to grant such a request, the United States government would have to declare that an imminent threat to the canal's safety existed.

On the same day, the Secretary of State, Cordell Hull, issued the following statement:

On February 18, the Panamanian government issued a memorandum that included twelve specific demands in exchange for the base leases:

Transfer, without cost, of the sanitation systems in the cities of Panama and Colon
Transfer of all lands belonging to the Panama Railroad in Panama City and Colon, valued at approximately $12 million
Both governments to intensify their efforts at preventing contraband from the Canal Zone into Panamanian territory
Construction of a bridge across the canal
U.S. assumption of a third of all costs to improve and maintain all roads and highways used by its military in Panama
The cessation of importing Caribbean blacks to work in the Canal Zone
U.S. military police and zone police restricted to the use of only billy clubs outside of the zone
Excess electricity from canal operations to be distributed to Panama City and Colon, as requested by the Panamanian government
United States to assume full cost of the road to Rio Hato, and therefore to pay the $2 million borrowed by Panama for this purchase from the U.S.-operated Export-Import Bank
The United States to transfer the railroad station in Panama City to the government of Panama
The United States to pay an indemnity of the flow of U.S. troops during wartime interrupted regular canal traffic
The United States to provide workers for building an oil pipeline between Panama City and the Balboa port.

The cost of meeting these demands was estimated to be $25–30 million, and was one of the reasons why the negotiations lasted so long. There was also a serious disagreement over the length of the leases for the new defense sites. Most agreed that 999 years was simply way too long, and tantamount to ownership. So, after abandoning the request for 999-year leases, the military sought them for at least a ten-year period, the State Department wanted them for as long as a threat to the canal existed, and Arias wanted the bases back as soon as the war ended. Another controversial issue was the United States government's request to arm ships registered in Panama. The Battle of the Atlantic was taking its toll on the supply lines from America to Britain, and some of the ships were being sunk not long after exiting the canal. Because Panama was officially neutral at this point in the war, German U-boats could not legally attack Panamanian-flagged ships. President Arias refused to help, however, and American plans to use U.S.-owned ships flying a Panamanian flag to supply the British were interrupted.

President De la Guardia

Arias' refusal to help the Allies by arming Panamanian ships, and his hard-line stance during the defense site negotiations led many in the United States government to conclude that "he had to go." One man said the following about a possible American invasion to oust Arias: "The present conditions are considered dangerous to the security of the canal and it is believed that they should be corrected as soon as possible. A local revolution to throw out the crooked pro-Axis officialdom would be preferable to intervention by U.S. forces." Shortly thereafter, on October 7, 1941, the Americans were granted their wish when a bloodless coup removed Arias from power. With Ricardo Adolfo de la Guardia as the new president, the defense site negotiations moved forward quickly and positively for the United States. Then the Japanese attacked the American naval base in Hawaii, which accelerated the process of negotiations even more. The new Panamanian government declared war on Japan on December 7, 1941, on the same day of the attack on Pearl Harbor, and a day before the United States officially entered the war. Panama then declared war on Germany and Fascist Italy on December 13, 1941, along with a few other Latin American states.

On May 18, 1942, the United States and Panama finally signed an agreement for the lease of 134 sites to be used for the protection of the canal. The accord called for the occupation of the sites to end one year after the end of the war, and for the United States to pay $50 per hectare annually for the bases, except Rio Hato, for which it would pay $10,000 a year. Finally, Panama received promises for the completion of various public works projects, including the Rio Hato Road, the bridge over the canal, and a third set of locks for the canal itself.

Ironically, in spite of De la Guardia's cooperation with the United States, throughout the war the American government refused repeated Panamanian requests for Lend-Lease assistance. A State Department official was quoted as saying: "[it was] desirable to keep something dangling before the noses of our Panamanian friends. There is no profit to us in giving the present administration all of the gravy." However, in order to reward De la Guardia for his actions, and in order to bolster the president's position domestically, the United States provided the new government with hundreds of automatic weapons and pistols, boats, and other war materials, in addition to a permanent military mission to assist in training the Panamanian National Police. Some of the weapons provided by the United States were soon put to work in putting down an armed coup. In September 1943, a group of dissident police officers and civilians plotted a rebellion, but they were uncovered by loyal police shortly thereafter, and crushed accordingly.

President Jiménez
The end of the war in September 1945 brought about another misunderstanding between Panama and the United States. Although the peace treaty had not entered into effect, Panama demanded that ownership of the defense sites be relinquished, resting its claim on a subsidiary provision of the agreement permitting renegotiation after the cessation of hostilities. Overriding the desire of the War Department to hold most of the bases for an indefinite period, the State Department took cognizance of growing nationalist dissatisfaction and in December 1946 sent Ambassador Frank T. Hines to propose a twenty-year extension of the leases on thirteen facilities. President Enrique Adolfo Jiménez, who took office in June 1945, authorized a draft treaty over the opposition of the foreign minister and exacerbated latent resentment.

When the National Assembly met in 1947 to consider ratification, a mob of 10,000 Panamanians armed with stones, machetes, and guns expressed opposition. Under these circumstances the deputies voted unanimously to reject the treaty. By 1948 the United States had evacuated all occupied bases and sites outside the Canal Zone. The upheaval of 1947 was instigated in large measure by university students. Their clash with the National Police on that occasion, in which both students and policemen were killed, marked the beginning of a period of intense animosity between the two groups. The incident was also the first in which American intentions were thwarted by a massive expression of Panamanian rage.

Defenses

In the 1930s, events and technological developments began to challenge the old axioms on which the defense of the canal had been based. A crippling attack aimed at the locks and dams, and delivered either by an act of sabotage or by naval bombardment, had always been considered the only real danger to be guarded against. Now, with the advent of modern aircraft carriers and long-range bombers, an attack by air quickly became the most serious threat to the canal's safety. The possibility of hostile forces establishing a beachhead and moving overland to the Canal Zone was not entirely discounted, but the absence of suitable landing places on the Atlantic side and the thick jungle of the Pacific lowlands were counted on to discourage any attack of this sort. The United States Army had disposed its defenses accordingly. Each end of the canal was heavily protected by a concentration of coastal artillery that at one time was regarded as the most powerful and effective of any in the world. In addition, the lock areas – at Gatun, Pedro Miguel, and Miraflores – were protected by land fortifications.

The army had been given the mission of protecting the canal against sabotage and of defending it from positions within the Canal Zone. Close in defense was thus an army responsibility except for two specific tasks: that of providing an armed guard on vessels passing through the canal, and that of maintaining a harbor patrol at the entrances to the canal. Both of these tasks were entrusted to the United States Navy, along with its primary responsibility for offshore defense. The Air Corps forces in Panama were to be prepared to assist the navy in its main task of detecting and repelling enemy forces at sea, but only so far as air bases within the Canal Zone would permit, and only to an extent agreed upon by the local army commander. At the top of the military hierarchy was the commanding general of the Panama Canal Department. Directly under him were the commanders of the 19th Air Wing and of the two sectors, each one of which was independent of the other.

In the years before and during World War II, American forces stationed in Panama were assigned to one of two sectors: The Atlantic Sector, initially with the 1st Coast Artillery Regiment and the 14th Infantry Regiment, guarded the northern (Atlantic) entrance of the canal, and the Pacific Sector, with the 4th Coast Artillery Regiment, the 33rd Infantry Regiment, and a battalion of the 2nd Field Artillery, guarded the southern (Pacific) end. In addition to the troops assigned to the sectors, certain units were directly under the commanding general of the Panama Canal Department. These department troops included air units – the 19th Composite Wing, with about twenty-eight medium bombers, fourteen light bombers, twenty-four pursuit planes, and a few trainers and utility planes – plus a regiment of combat engineers, together with Signal Corps, quartermaster, and ordnance units, and other service and administrative detachments.

In 1939, the total strength of the garrison came to approximately 13,500 men. Over the next few years, the defenses in Panama were gradually improved, and the American population in the Canal Zone grew. At the height of the war, 65,000 American soldiers were stationed in Panama, plus tens of thousands of civilian employees and other military personnel. Among the new military infrastructure in Panama was an airbase, Howard Field, which was necessary for the operation of modern aircraft. Other facilities, such as Albrook Field, the naval base at Coco Solo, and the coastal defenses, were expanded and modernized. In spite of the heavy defenses, and the canal's importance to the Allied war effort, Panama never came under attack by the Axis, and the threat of one seemed to diminish more and more as the war progressed. Both the Germans and the Japanese did, however, develop plans to bomb the canal with aircraft deployed from submarines. The German plan, codenamed Operation Pelikan, was aborted for unknown reasons in late 1943, just after preparations had been completed. The Japanese operation was scheduled for mid-1945, but it was also aborted because by then the war was almost over, and so bombing the canal wasn't as urgent as stopping the American fleet that was advancing across the Pacific.

Gallery

See also

 History of Panama (1904-1964)
 Panama Sea Frontier
 Southeast Pacific Area
 Inter-American Highway
 Battle of the Caribbean
 Military history of the United States during World War II
 Colombia during World War II

References

Military history of Panama during World War II
Panama
1939 in Panama
1940s in Panama
Panama
North America in World War II